The 1974 Montreal Expos season was the sixth season in the history of the franchise. The Expos finished in fourth place in the National League East with a record of 79–82, 8½ games behind the Pittsburgh Pirates.

Offseason
 October 26, 1973: Bernie Allen was released by the Expos.
 December 5, 1973: Mike Marshall was traded by the Expos to the Los Angeles Dodgers for Willie Davis.
 January 9, 1974: Joe Kerrigan was drafted by the Expos in the 1st round (10th pick) of the 1974 Major League Baseball draft.

Spring training
The Expos held spring training at City Island Ball Park in Daytona Beach, Florida. It was their second season there.

Regular season

Season standings

Record vs. opponents

Opening Day lineup

Notable transactions
 April 1, 1974: John Boccabella was traded by the Expos to the San Francisco Giants for Don Carrithers.
 April 4, 1974: Bill Stoneman was purchased from the Expos by the California Angels.
 June 5, 1974: Bobby Ramos was drafted by the Expos in the 7th round of the 1974 Major League Baseball draft.
 September 5, 1974: Ron Hunt was selected off waivers from the Expos by the St. Louis Cardinals.

Roster

Player stats

Batting

Starters by position
Note: Pos = Position; G = Games played; AB = At bats; H = Hits; Avg. = Batting average; HR = Home runs; RBI = Runs batted in

Other batters
Note: G = Games played; AB = At bats; H = Hits; Avg. = Batting average; HR = Home runs; RBI = Runs batted in

Pitching

Starting pitchers
Note: G = Games pitched; IP = Innings pitched; W = Wins; L = Losses; ERA = Earned run average; SO = Strikeouts

Other pitchers
Note: G = Games pitched; IP = Innings pitched; W = Wins; L = Losses; ERA = Earned run average; SO = Strikeouts

Relief pitchers
Note: G = Games pitched; W = Wins; L = Losses; SV = Saves; ERA = Earned run average; SO = Strikeouts

Award winners

1974 Major League Baseball All-Star Game

Farm system

LEAGUE CHAMPIONS: West Palm Beach

Notes

References

 1974 Montreal Expos at Baseball Reference
 1974 Montreal Expos at Baseball Almanac
 

Montreal Expos seasons
Montreal Expos season
1970s in Montreal
1974 in Quebec